Frederick Harris (2 July 1912 – 11 October 1998) was an English footballer who played his whole professional career for Birmingham City.

Life and career
Harris was born in Solihull, Warwickshire. He joined Birmingham as an inside forward in 1933 at the age of 19, and scored on his debut in a 2–1 home win against local rivals Aston Villa at the start of the 1934–35 season. He was the club's leading scorer in 1938–39 with 14 League goals and 17 in all competitions.

During the Second World War he converted to play as a wing half and played out the rest of his career in that position. His strong tackling and constructive use of the ball impressed manager Harry Storer sufficiently to make him club captain. He is credited with recommending Johnny Berry to Birmingham, having seen him play for an Army team while both were serving in India during the war. He won representative honours for the Football League XI against the Scottish League in 1948–49.

Harris retired from football in 1950, aged nearly 38, having made 312 appearances in all competitions for Birmingham and scored 68 goals, and became a chiropodist and physiotherapist in the Acocks Green district of Birmingham. He died in Solihull in October 1998 at the age of 86.

His nephew, Roy McDonough, was also a professional footballer.

Honours
Birmingham City
 Top goalscorer: 1938–39
 Football League South (wartime league): 1945–46
 Second Division: 1947–48

References

1912 births
1998 deaths
Sportspeople from Solihull
English footballers
Association football inside forwards
Association football wing halves
Birmingham City F.C. players
English Football League players
English Football League representative players